Kambuga General Hospital, also Kambuga Hospital is a government-owned hospital in the Western Region of Uganda.

Location
The coordinates of hospital are 0°48'50.0"S, 29°48'03.0"E (Latitude:-0.813902; Longitude:29.800839).

Overview
Kambuga General Hospital was established in 1965. It is owned by the Uganda Ministry of Health. It is administered by the Kanungu District local government. According to a published report in 2006, the hospital buildings and equipment were dilapidated and crumbling. The district local government is struggling to run the hospital due to poor funding.

See also
List of hospitals in Uganda

References

External links
 Website of Uganda Ministry of Health

Hospitals in Uganda
Kanungu District
1965 establishments in Uganda
Hospital buildings completed in 1965